Kolejowy Klub Sportowy Czarni Sosnowiec, commonly referred to as Czarni Sosnowiec, is a football club from Sosnowiec, Poland. The club was founded in 1924, and its home ground is the Jan Ciszewski's Stadium. It has a women's and a men's section.

Women's football section 
Women's football team, founded 5 September 1974, holds the Polish record for championship titles won, with 13 titles to its name. After some financial problems the club was in the 2007–08 season relegated from the Ekstraliga Kobiet; in 2008–09 they reached the promotion playoffs but lost convincingly. With the expansion of the Ekstraliga in 2010–11 a second-place was enough to ensure direct promotion again. In 2021, they won their first championship in over twenty years.

Honours 
 Polish Championship (13): 1979/80, 1980/81, 1983/84, 1984/85, 1985/86, 1986/87, 1988/89, 1990/91, 1996/97, 1997/98, 1998/99, 1999/00, 2020/21
 Polish Cup: 1984/85, 1986/87, 1988/89, 1994/95, 1995/96, 1996/97, 1997/98, 1998/99, 1999/2000, 2000/01, 2001/02, 2020/21

European competitions

Men's football section 
As of the 2021–22 season, men's section of Czarni compete in the 8th-tier Klasa B.

References

External links 
 Official Website
 Women's football section profile at 90minut.pl (in Polish)
 Men's football section profile at 90minut.pl (in Polish)

Football clubs in Poland
Women's football clubs in Poland
Sosnowiec
Football clubs in Silesian Voivodeship
Association football clubs established in 1924
1924 establishments in Poland
Railway association football clubs in Poland